The Cold Springs Rancheria of Mono Indians of California is a federally recognized tribe of Mono Native Americans. Cold Springs Rancheria is the tribe's reservation, which is located in Fresno County, California.  As of the 2010 Census the population was 184.

Culture
The Cold Springs tribe is composed of Western Mono Indians, whose traditional homeland is in the southern Sierra Nevada foothills of California. The Mono language is part of the Uto-Aztecan language family. Acorns are a traditional staple food with great symbolic importance. Their oral history is included in Mono traditional narratives.

Government
They ratified their current tribal constitution on April 11, 1970 and last amended it in 2001. Their Tribal Council is democratically elected and includes a Chairperson, Vice-Chairperson, Secretary-Treasurer and three Council Members. Additionally all tribal members 18 years old or older form a voting General Council.

Enrollment
Tribal enrollment to the Cold Springs Rancheria is limited to those members listed on the 1960 Plan for Distribution of Assets of the Cold Springs Rancheria roles and their lineal descendants that have a blood quantum of at least one-quarter degree of Californian Indian blood. Approximately 159 to 193 people lived on the Cold Springs Rancheria, and there are 265 to 275 enrolled members of the tribe.

Reservation
The lands are close to Tollhouse, California, where the tribe is headquartered.

Mono tribes
Other federally recognized Mono tribes are the Tule River Indian Tribe of the Tule River Reservation, the Big Sandy Rancheria of Mono Indians of California, the Northfork Rancheria of Mono Indians of California, Big Pine Band of Owens Valley Paiute Shoshone Indians of the Big Pine Reservation.

Education
The ranchería is served by the Sierra Unified School District.

Notes

References
 Pritzker, Barry M. A Native American Encyclopedia: History, Culture, and Peoples. Oxford: Oxford University Press, 2000.

External links
 Constitution and Bylaws of the Cold Springs Rancheria

Mono tribe
Native American tribes in California
Federally recognized tribes in the United States